Lobby Land is a British political satire broadcast on BBC Radio 4. It centres on political editor Samantha Peakes of fictional clickbait website Hot Takes as she tries to scoop a story from the events in Westminster and avoid losing her job. It is very topical, using current events to form part of the story, and was commissioned as "a sharp satirical sitcom for post-Brexit Britain". It is created, produced and co-written by Jon Harvey.

Characters

Principal cast
Samantha (Sam) Peakes, political editor of the clickbait website Hot Takes, who has to fight to ensure her job and politics articles are secure. The actor playing Samantha has changed with each series: for the pilot it was Gemma Whelan, for series 1 it was Ophelia Lovibond and for series 2 it was Yasmine Akram.
Mia Phillips, played by Cariad Lloyd, is a showbiz reporter for Hot Takes who specialises in listicle and clickbait articles. She is a close friend of Sam and the two share a flat.
Tom Shriver MP, played by Charlie Higson, is one of Sam's key sources in Westminster and is often involved in every episode in some way. For series 1, he was identified as a Conservative MP but from series 2 onwards he is identified as an independent.
Sam is often accompanied by an intern, Scot Lawrence Mills played by Ryan Sampson in series 1 and Nathan Edmonds played by Daniel Lawrence Taylor in series 2.
Sam often has to contend with the editor of Hot Takes, who is Dom Bell in series 1, played by Lewis MacLeod, and Gideon Burnside in series 2, played by Dan Tetsell.

Episode list

Pilot

Series one
The cast for the first series was largely the same as that of the pilot with the main change being the replacement of Whelan with Lovibond for Sam Peakes. The series was produced by Hat Trick Productions. The plot of the first episode of the series overlaps significantly with the plot of the pilot with both focused on Sam finding a Westminster source.

Series two
A number of cast changes were made between the two series with only Higson and Lloyd remaining as part of the main cast. The series was recorded in front of a live audience. Production of the second series was carried out by Naked Productions for BBC Radio 4.

References

External links
Lobby Land at BBC Online.

BBC Radio comedy programmes
BBC Radio 4 programmes